Involucrella is a genus of flowering plants in the family Rubiaceae. The genus is found from Northeast India to Hainan and Peninsular Malaysia and the Philippines.

Species
Involucrella chereevensis 
Involucrella coronaria

References

Rubiaceae genera